North Avoca is a south-eastern suburb of the Central Coast region of New South Wales, Australia between Avoca Beach and Terrigal on the Tasman Sea coast. It is part of the  local government area.

References

Suburbs of the Central Coast (New South Wales)